Ministry of Health and Medical Services (MHMS) is a government ministry of the Solomon Islands. Its head office is in Honiara. The divisions in the ministry are Administration & Management, Health Care, Health Improvement, Health Policy and Planning. The health care division operates hospitals in the country.

References

External links
 Ministry of Health and Medical Services - Commonwealth of Nations
 

Solomon Islands
Government of the Solomon Islands